The Battle of Big Black River Bridge was fought on May 17, 1863, as part of the Vicksburg Campaign of the American Civil War. After a Union army commanded by Major General Ulysses S. Grant defeated Lieutenant General John C. Pemberton's Confederate army at the Battle of Champion Hill on May 16, Pemberton ordered Brigadier General John S. Bowen to hold a rear guard at the crossing of the Big Black River to buy time for the Confederate army to regroup. Union troops commanded by Major General John McClernand pursued the Confederates, and encountered Bowen's rear guard. A Union charge quickly broke the Confederate position, and during the retreat and river crossing, a rout ensued.

Many Confederate soldiers were captured, and 18 Confederate cannons were taken by the Union troops. The retreating Confederates burned both the railroad bridge over the Big Black River, as well as a steamboat that had been serving as a bridge. The surviving Confederate soldiers entered the fortifications at Vicksburg, Mississippi, and the siege of Vicksburg began the next day.

Background

In March 1863, Major General Ulysses S. Grant of the Union Army was planning an attack against the strategically important city of Vicksburg, Mississippi. Grant determined that there were three possible routes of attack against Vicksburg: from the north, from the south, and from across the Mississippi River. An attack across the river was determined to be likely to incur many casualties, and concentrating forces in the Memphis, Tennessee, area for an attack from the north could be misconstrued as a retreat, which would be politically disadvantageous. Grant therefore decided to attack from the south. On April 29, elements of the Union Navy attempted to shell Confederate fortifications at Grand Gulf, Mississippi, into submission in the Battle of Grand Gulf. When this failed, Union infantry commanded by Major General John McClernand were landed further down the river, leveraging the Confederates out of their Grand Gulf fortifications by threatening the Confederate line of retreat.

On May 1, Confederate forces commanded by Brigadier General John S. Bowen, who had commanded at Grand Gulf, attempted to fight a blocking action at the Battle of Port Gibson. Although the Confederates, who were severely outnumbered, held their own for most of the day, Union troops eventually pushed back the right flank of the Confederate line, leading Bowen to decide to retreat from the field. On May 16, the Battle of Champion Hill occurred. Lieutenant General John C. Pemberton had concentrated most of his Confederate army to attempt to block Grant's army from reaching Vicksburg. Union attacks drove in much of the Confederate line, although a counterattack by Bowen's division threatened to change the tide of the battle. Eventually, Union reinforcements forced Bowen to retreat, and the Union had control of the field.

Battle

On the night of the 16th, after the defeat at Champion Hill, Pemberton formed a line at the crossing of the Big Black River in order to buy time for his army. For this rear guard, Pemberton selected the Missouri troops of Bowen's division, Brigadier General John C. Vaughn's Tennessee brigade, and the 4th Mississippi Infantry Regiment. This force numbered about 5,000 men. The left of the Confederate line was held by Brigadier General Martin E. Green's brigade of Bowen's division, Vaughn's brigade held the center, Bowen's other brigade, commanded by Colonel Francis M. Cockrell, was positioned on the Confederate right, and the 4th Mississippi was placed between Cockrell and Vaughn. Vaughn's brigade was composed of inexperienced conscripts, and Bowen's division had seen heavy fighting at Champion Hill. The Confederate line was supported by Wade's Missouri Battery, Landis' Missouri Battery, and Guibor's Missouri Battery. A railroad ran through the Confederate position, and the river could be crossed either over the railroad bridge or over a steamboat that had been positioned crossways across the river, creating a makeshift bridge.

On the morning of May 17, McClernand's XIII Corps advanced towards the Confederate position at the Big Black River. Brigadier General Eugene A. Carr's division led the way, and deployed to confront the Confederate lines. The brigade of Brigadier General Michael K. Lawler formed the right of the Union line. Carr was soon reinforced by Brigadier General Peter J. Osterhaus' division. An artillery duel began, and Osterhaus was wounded in the leg by a shell fragment. After some preparations, Lawler's brigade charged, quickly breaking the Confederate line. Vaughn's brigade routed to the rear, and the gap in the line quickly forced Green's brigade to retreat as well. Lawler's charge had lasted only three minutes. Cockrell's brigade also collapsed in much disorder, one survivor summarized the retreat as "the devil take the hindmost being the order of the day." The 1st and 4th Missouri Infantry Regiment (Consolidated) served as a rear guard for the retreating Confederates, as it was one of the few units still in functioning order. The Confederates lost a number of cannons in the retreat due to an error; the horses for Wade's Battery, Guibor's Battery, and a portion of Landis's Battery had been positioned on the far side of the Big Black River, and were not available to haul off the cannons. In total, the Confederates lost 18 cannons at the Big Black River. The retreating Confederates burned both the bridge and the steamboat serving as a bridge, and those who escaped the Union army joined the fortifications at Vicksburg.

Sergeant William Wesley Kendall of the 49th Indiana Infantry Regiment was awarded the Medal of Honor for leading a company in the main Union charge; he was among the first Union soldiers to enter the Confederate fortifications.

Aftermath and preservation

The Confederates lost 1,751 men; almost 1,700 of the losses were in prisoners. Union casualties totaled either 273 or 276. After Big Black River Bridge, the siege of Vicksburg began on May 18. Grant attempted a major charge against the Vicksburg entrenchments on May 22, but this was repulsed. Attempts at exploding mines under the Confederate lines on June 25 and July 1 also failed to break the Confederate defenses. However, with no prospects of reinforcements and lack of food, Pemberton surrendered the Confederate defenders on July 4.

The site of the battle was listed on the National Register of Historic Places in 1971 as the Big Black River Battlefield. , portions of the piers of the railroad bridge existing during the battle still remain at the crossing of the Big Black River. A trail runs along the river bank, and a historical marker is placed in the vicinity of the battlefield, although the battlefield itself is privately owned. The Civil War Trust has acquired and preserved  of the battlefield.

Notes

References

Sources

Further reading
 Bearss, Edwin C. The Campaign for Vicksburg. Vol. 2, Grant Strikes a Fatal Blow. Dayton, OH: Morningside House, 1986. .
 Fullenkamp, Leonard, Stephen Bowman, and Jay Luvaas. Guide to the Vicksburg Campaign. Lawrence: University Press of Kansas, 1998. .
 Winschel, Terrence J. Triumph & Defeat: The Vicksburg Campaign. Campbell, CA: Savas Publishing Company, 1999. .
 Woodworth, Steven E., ed. Grant's Lieutenants: From Cairo to Vicksburg. Lawrence: University Press of Kansas, 2001. .

External links
National Park Service, Battle of Big Black River Bridge
West Point Atlas map of Grant's advance from Jackson to Vicksburg

Big Black River Bridge
Big Black River Bridge
Big Black River Bridge
Big Black River Bridge
Hinds County, Mississippi
Big Black River Bridge
1863 in Mississippi
May 1863 events